The 1955 Harvard Crimson football team was an American football team that represented Harvard University during the 1955 college football season. In their sixth year under head coach Lloyd Jordan, the Crimson compiled a 3–4–1 record but outscored opponents 143 to 114. William M. Meigs was the team captain.

This would be Harvard's final year as a football independent, as the Ivy League, which Harvard had helped co-found in 1954, began football competition in 1956. Six of the eight opponents on the Crimson's 1955 schedule were Ivy League members (with Penn the only Ivy not scheduled); for decades, (future) Ivy members had comprised a large portion of Harvard's opponents.

Harvard played its home games at Harvard Stadium in the Allston neighborhood of Boston, Massachusetts.

Schedule

References

Harvard
Harvard Crimson football seasons
Harvard Crimson football
1950s in Boston